The AFL Women's National Championship was the premier national and international competition in Women's Australian rules football. The championship was held every year between 1992 and 2015.

The tournament was organised by the sport's governing body in Australia, Women's Football Australia (WFA), with the Australian Football League taking control of its operations in 2010. 

Following the 2015 edition, the AFL announced the expanded 2016 Exhibition Series and the 2017 formation of the AFL Women's (AFLW) league, along with other associated competitions including the AFL Women's Under 18 Championships and the NAB League Girls: with this, the raison d'etre for the Championships and Women's Football Australia ceased to exist, and both ceased operations.

Teams

AFL Women's Under 18 Championships

References

External links

 
Recurring sporting events established in 1992
1992 establishments in Australia
Women's Australian rules football competitions in Australia